Mario Reis is a physicist, researcher and lecturer at Fluminense Federal University. He is specialist on magnetism, more precisely on molecular magnetism, magnetocaloric effect, nanomagnetism and other related topics. On these themes, he published over a hundred of scientific papers. and supervised dozens of graduate students and post-docs; and, in addition, published two books:
Mario Reis and A. Moreira dos Santos, Magnetismo Molecular, Editora Livraria da Física, 192 pgs (2010)
Mario Reis, Fundamentals of Magnetism, Elsevier, 297 pgs (2013).

Since 2016 he is an Editor of Physica B: Condensed Matter, an international journal published by Elsevier.

References

Year of birth missing (living people)
Living people
Brazilian physicists